Ptilocatagonia is a genus of bristle flies in the family Tachinidae.

Species
Ptilocatagonia viridescens Mesnil, 1956

Distribution
Sierra Leone, Tanzania, Zambia.

References

Exoristinae
Tachinidae genera
Diptera of Africa
Monotypic Brachycera genera